Camillo Rizzi (or Ricci) (1590–1626) was an Italian painter of the Renaissance period, active mainly in Ferrara. He was a pupil of the painter Ippolito Scarsella.

Born at Ferrara, he was mainly active producing altarpieces for the churches of Ferrara including a  S. Vincenzo and Santa Margherita for the cathedral ; an Annunciation for the church of Spirito Santo ; and his ceiling in the church of S. Niccolo, representing in eighty-four compartments, the Life and miracles of San Niccolo. Ricci died at Ferrara.

References

1590 births
1626 deaths
Painters from Ferrara
16th-century Italian painters
Italian male painters
17th-century Italian painters
Italian Renaissance painters